The banana song may refer to:
 The Name Game, an American popular music song as a rhyming game that creates variations on a person's name.
 Day-O (The Banana Boat Song), a traditional Jamaican folk song from the point of view of dock workers working the night shift loading bananas onto ships.